The Russian Women's Volleyball Super League, is the highest professional women's volleyball league in Russia. It is organized and administrated by the Russian Volleyball Federation.

History
The dissolution of the Soviet Union in late 1991 brought an end to all sports leagues played in the Soviet Union, including the Soviet Women's Volleyball Championship. The national league was created by the Russian Volleyball Federation as a continuation of the Soviet Championships. The 1991–92 inaugural season had the participation of clubs based in the Russian Commonwealth and Yugoslavia. From the second season onwards only clubs based in Russia were allowed to compete.

This is how the League changed its name and structure through time.

Teams
The following clubs are competing in the 2020–21 season:

Results

Source

Titles by club

All-time team records 
Winners and finalists by city since 1991/1992

Various statistics since 2007/2008

(Based on W=2 pts and D=1 pts)

Lyudmila Buldakova award
The award for best player of the Super League was created by the Russian Volleyball Federation in 2006 and named after two time Olympic gold medallist Lyudmila Buldakova, a former player who died that year. The winner is voted by the head coaches of the league's teams.

See also
Volleyball in Russia 
Soviet Women's Volleyball Championship

References

External links
 Volleyball in Russia
  Russian League. women.volleybox.net 

Volleyball competitions in Russia
Russia
1991 establishments in Russia
Women's volleyball leagues
Women's sports leagues in Russia
Professional sports leagues in Russia